Dentimargo spengleri is a species of minute sea snail, a marine gastropod mollusk or micromollusk in the family Marginellidae, the margin snails.

Description

Distribution

References

Marginellidae
Gastropods described in 2007